This is the discography for jazz record label Prestige Records. Not all original releases are included. Others are listed by the Jazz Discography Project. The earlier New Jazz/Prestige 78rpm releases and the 100/200 (10" LP) series, (among others) are omitted. Prestige also released albums on several subsidiary labels including the New Jazz, Bluesville, Moodsville and Swingsville labels.

The Prestige Recordings or The Complete Prestige Recordings CD box sets have been released for Davis, Coltrane, Dolphy, Monk, Rollins, Gordon, and others.

Discography

7000 series (12" LPs)

New Jazz and Status 8300 series (12" LPs)

10000 series (12" LPs)
The Prestige 10000 Series commenced in 1971 when the label was sold to Fantasy Records and the label was moved to San Francisco California

Swingville (12" LPs)
SVLP 2001  Coleman Hawkins and Red Garland – Coleman Hawkins with the Red Garland Trio
SVLP 2002  Tiny Grimes – Tiny in Swingville
SVLP 2003  Buddy Tate and His band – Tate's Date
SVLP 2004  Tiny Grimes – Callin' the Blues – reissue of Prestige PRLP 7144
SVLP 2005  Coleman Hawkins – Coleman Hawkins All Stars
SVLP 2006  Rex Stewart – The Happy Jazz of Rex Stewart
SVLP 2007  Al Casey – Buck Jumpin'
SVLP 2008  Pee Wee Russell with Buck Clayton – Swingin' with Pee Wee
SVLP 2009  Claude Hopkins with Buddy Tate and Emmett Berry – Yes Indeed! 
SVLP 2010  The Swingville All-Stars featuring Al Sears, Taft Jordan and Hilton Jefferson – Rockin' in Rhythm
SVLP 2011  Joe Newman – Jive at Five
SVLP 2012  Bud Freeman with Shorty Baker – The Bud Freeman All-Stars featuring Shorty Baker 
SVLP 2013  The Prestige Blues-Swingers – Stasch
SVLP 2014  Buddy Tate / Clark Terry – Tate-a-Tate
SVLP 2015  Budd Johnson – Let's Swing!
SVLP 2016  Coleman Hawkins – Night Hawk
SVLP 2017  Buck Clayton / Buddy Tate – Buck & Buddy
SVLP 2018  Al Sears – Swing's the Thing
SVLP 2019  Joe Newman – Good 'n' Groovy
SVLP 2020  Claude Hopkins with Buddy Tate and Joe Thomas – Let's Jam
SVLP 2021  Shorty Baker and Doc Cheatham – Shorty & Doc
SVLP 2022  Jimmy Hamilton – It's About Time
SVLP 2023  Hal Singer – Blue Stompin'''
SVLP 2024/25 The First Annual Prestige Swing Festival featuring Coleman Hawkins, Buddy Tate, Al Sears, Hilton Jefferson – Things Ain't What They Used to Be - 2-LP set reissued as two separate LPs: Things Ain't What They Used to Be and Years Ago and re-released as Jam Session in Swingville 
SVLP 2026  Cliff Jackson / Dick Wellstood – Uptown and LowdownSVLP 2027  Joe Newman – Joe's Hap'nin'sSVLP 2028  Jimmy Hamilton – Can't Help SwingingSVLP 2029  Buddy Tate – Groovin' with Buddy TateSVLP 2030  Buck Clayton / Buddy Tate – Buck & Buddy Blow the BluesSVLP 2031  Leonard Gaskin – At the Jazz Band BallSVLP 2032  Benny Carter/Ben Webster/Barney Bigard – BBB & Co.SVLP 2033  Leonard Gaskin – Darktown Strutters BallSVLP 2034  Henry "Red" Allen – Mr. AllenSVLP 2035  Coleman Hawkins – Blues Groove – reissue of Prestige PRLP 7138
SVLP 2036  Paul Quinichette – For Basie – reissue of Prestige PRLP 7127
SVLP 2037  The Prestige All Stars – Basie Reunion – reissue of Prestige PRLP 7147
SVLP 2038  Coleman Hawkins – Soul – reissue of Prestige PRLP 7149
SVLP 2039  Coleman Hawkins – Hawk Eyes – reissue of Prestige PRLP 7156
SVLP 2040  Leonard Gaskin – Dixieland HitsSVLP 2041  Claude Hopkins with Budd Johnson and Vic Dickenson – Swing Time!Moodsville (12" LPs)
MVLP 1   Red Garland/Eddie "Lockjaw" Davis – The Red Garland Trio + Eddie "Lockjaw" DavisMVLP 2   Various Artists – Modern MoodsMVLP 3   Red Garland – Red AloneMVLP 4   Eddie "Lockjaw" Davis/Shirley Scott – Eddie "Lockjaw" Davis with Shirley ScottMVLP 5   Shirley Scott – The Shirley Scott TrioMVLP 6   Red Garland – The Red Garland TrioMVLP 7   Coleman Hawkins – At Ease with Coleman HawkinsMVLP 8   Frank Wess – The Frank Wess QuartetMVLP 9   Tommy Flanagan – The Tommy Flanagan TrioMVLP 10  Red Garland – Alone with the BluesMVLP 11  Lem Winchester – Lem Winchester with FeelingMVLP 12  Al Casey – The Al Casey QuartetMVLP 13  Oliver Nelson/Lem Winchester – NocturneMVLP 14  Arnett Cobb – Ballads by CobbMVLP 15  Coleman Hawkins – The Hawk RelaxesMVLP 16  Billy Taylor – InterludeMVLP 17  Willis Jackson – In My SolitudeMVLP 18  Gene Ammons – Nice an' CoolMVLP 19  Shirley Scott – Like CozyMVLP 20  Clark Terry – Everything's MellowMVLP 21  Taft Jordan – Taft Jordan Plays Duke Ellington – Mood Indigo!!!MVLP 22  Yusef Lateef – Eastern SoundsMVLP 23  Coleman Hawkins – Good Old BroadwayMVLP 24  Sam Taylor – The Bad and the BeautifulMVLP 25  Coleman Hawkins – The Jazz Version of No StringsMVLP 26  Clark Terry – Clark Terry Plays the Jazz Version of All AmericanMVLP 27  Cootie Williams – The Solid Trumpet of Cootie WilliamsMVLP 28  Gene Ammons – The Soulful Moods of Gene AmmonsMVLP 29  Kenny Burrell with Coleman Hawkins – Bluesy BurrellMVLP 30  Eddie "Lockjaw" Davis/Shirley Scott – MistyMVLP 31  Coleman Hawkins – Coleman Hawkins Plays Make Someone Happy from Do Re MiMVLP 32  Miles Davis/John Coltrane – Miles Davis and John Coltrane Play Richard RodgersMVLP 33  Various Artists – Music of George Gershwin Played by America's Greatest JazzmenMVLP 34  Various Artists – Music of Cole Porter Played by America's Greatest JazzmenMVLP 35  Various Artists – Music of Richard Rodgers Played by America's Greatest JazzmenMVLP 36  Dave Pike – Dave Pike Plays the Jazz Version of Oliver!MVLP 37  Various Artists – Lusty Moods Played by America's Greatest JazzmenMVLP 38  Various Artists – The Broadway Scene Played by America's Greatest JazzmenMVLP 39  Lucky Thompson – Lucky Thompson Plays Jerome Kern and No More''

References

 
Discographies of American record labels